Zhu Guangya, or Kuang-Ya Chu (December 25, 1924 – February 26, 2011), was a Chinese nuclear physicist. Zhu Guangya was noted for his dedication to the Chinese nuclear development, and his great devotion for his country.

Zhu Guangya graduated from the National Southwest Associated University in 1945; in 1950, he received his Ph.D. in physics from the University of Michigan. In 1980, he was elected as a member (academician) of the Chinese Academy of Sciences; in 1991, he served as the chairman of the China Association for Science and Technology. In 1994, he was selected as one of the first academicians of the Chinese Academy of Engineering, and served as the first President of the Chinese Academy of Engineering. In May 1996, he was elected as the honorary chairman of the China Association for Science and Technology; in January 1999, he was appointed as the director of the Science and Technology Committee of the People's Liberation Army General Armament Department.

In the early days, Zhu Guangya was mainly engaged in teaching and scientific research in nuclear physics and atomic energy technology; in the late 1950s, he was in charge of and organized and led the research, design, manufacture and testing of China's atomic bombs and hydrogen bombs. Zhu participated in and led the formulation and implementation of the national high-tech research and development plan, and the research on national defense science and technology development strategies. He organized and led the research on the sustainable development of China's nuclear weapons technology under the conditions of the nuclear test ban, the research on arms control and the research on the development strategy of weapons and equipment, and made significant contributions to the development of China's nuclear science and technology and national defense science and technology.

Biography
Zhu Guangya was born in December 25th, 1924 in Yichang, Hubei province. He received his early education in Hubei, and later moved to Sichuan province with his family, due to the outbreak of the Second World War. Young Guangya developed his interests in physics during high school in Sichuan, and he got accepted to the Physics Department at the National Central University (nowadays the Nanjing University) in 1941. One year later, he transferred to National Southwestern Associated University where he continued his study in physical science, and graduated in 1945. After graduation, Zhu stayed at the University and became a lecturer. In 1946, Zhu became a graduate student at the University of Michigan, where he later obtained his doctoral degree in physics in 1949.

He returned to China in the spring of 1950. After 1957, he was involved in nuclear reactor research. Together with Deng Jiaxian and others, Zhu led the development of China's atomic bomb and hydrogen bomb program.

In 1994 when Chinese Academy of Engineering (CAE) was founded, he served as the first president. In 1999, he received an achievement medal in recognition of his contribution to China's Two Bombs, One Satellite projects.

Zhu was an alternate member of 9th and 10th Central Committees of the Chinese Communist Party (CCP), and a full member of 11th, 12th, 13th and 14th Central Committees of CCP.

Zhu died on February 26, 2011, at the age of 86.

References 

1924 births
2011 deaths
Chinese nuclear physicists
Chinese Communist Party politicians from Hubei
Educators from Hubei
Academic staff of Jilin University
Members of the Chinese Academy of Engineering
Members of the Chinese Academy of Sciences
Chongqing Nankai Secondary School alumni
National Southwestern Associated University alumni
Academic staff of Peking University
People's Republic of China politicians from Hubei
Physicists from Hubei
Politicians from Wuhan
Vice Chairpersons of the National Committee of the Chinese People's Political Consultative Conference
University of Michigan College of Literature, Science, and the Arts alumni
Chinese expatriates in the United States
University of Michigan alumni